The diplomatic relations between the Republic of Austria and Romania were largely determined and limited by the global political environment. Generally good cooperation has always been in the interest of Romanian and Austrian foreign policy. Romania has a permanent mission in Vienna named The permanent mission of Romania near the international organizations of Vienna. Romania has an embassy in Vienna and six honorary consulates in Eisenstadt, Linz, Salzburg, Graz, Klagenfurt am Wörthersee and Sankt Pölten-Niederösterreich. Romania has the Romanian Cultural Institute in Vienna. Austria has an embassy in Bucharest and two honorary consulates. Austria has in Bucharest the Austrian cultural forum.
Austria has given full support to Romania's membership of the European Union.

History
On 8 December 2022, a vote was held for the accession of Bulgaria, Croatia and Romania to the Schengen Area. These countries would enter the zone only with a unanimous vote. Croatia entered, but Romania's entry was vetoed by Austria, while that of Bulgaria was vetoed by both Austria and the Netherlands. In Romania, the Austrian veto caused outrage. The Romanian ambassador to Austria was withdrawn from Vienna, and it was announced that relations between the two countries would be reduced significantly. Romanian companies, entrepreneurs, museums and universities began to boycott any type of cooperation with Austria or with Austrian companies, with the Ministry of Tourism of Romania advising Romanians not to go skiing in Austria on the next winter holidays. At a branch of the Austrian bank Raiffeisen Zentralbank on the Romanian city of Cluj-Napoca, an inscription appeared on the walls of the building reading "Nazi Bank"; municipal police began an investigation into this incident on 9 December. , president of the Association for Clean Energy and Fighting Climate Change, asked for an economical compensation of 200 million euros per month to Romania from Austria, as this is what the Romanian GDP would lose for each month that it was not in the Schengen Area according to an analysis by the Romanian company Big 4.

See also 
 Foreign relations of Austria 
 Foreign relations of Romania
 Accession of Romania to the European Union

References

External links
 Ambasada Austriei in Bucharest
 Ambasada României in Vienna

Austria–Romania relations
Romania
Bilateral relations of Romania